Zatania is a genus of ants in the subfamily Formicinae. The genus is known from Central America and the Greater Antilles.

The generic name is derived from Greek za, "very", tany, "long", referencing its elongated body features.

Species
 Zatania albimaculata (Santschi, 1930)
 Zatania cisipa (Smith & Lavigne, 1973)
Zatania darlingtoni (Wheeler, 1936)
 †Zatania electra LaPolla, Kallal & Brady, 2012
 Zatania gibberosa (Roger, 1863)
 Zatania gloriosa LaPolla, Kallal & Brady, 2012
 Zatania karstica (Fontenla, 2000)

References

Formicinae
Ant genera
Hymenoptera of North America